Consort Jang may refer to:

Jang Nok-su (died 1506), concubine of Yeonsangun of Joseon
Queen Inseon (1619–1674), wife of Hyojong of Joseon
Jang Ok-jeong (1659–1701), consort of Sukjong of Joseon